Danger in the Club is the second and final studio album by British rock band Palma Violets. It was released on 4 May 2015 through Rough Trade Records.

Accolades

Track listing

References 

http://www.nme.com/news/palma-violets/82947

2015 albums
Palma Violets albums
Rough Trade Records albums